Jason Edward Bratton (born October 19, 1972) is a former professional American football running back in the National Football League. He attended Grambling State University and played with the Buffalo Bills in 1996.

External links
Pro-Football reference

1972 births
Living people
People from Longview, Texas
Players of American football from Texas
Buffalo Bills players
Grambling State Tigers football players